The 1999 Honda Indy 300 was the nineteenth and penultimate round of the 1999 CART season, held on 17 October 1999 on the Surfers Paradise Street Circuit, Surfers Paradise, Queensland, Australia.

Qualifying results

Race

Notes

 Average Speed 91.849 mph

External links
 Full Weekend Times & Results

Honda Indy 300
Honda Indy 300
Gold Coast Indy 300